Norm of the North is a 2016 computer-animated comedy film directed by Trevor Wall and written by Daniel R. Altiere, Steven M. Altiere, and Malcolm T. Goldman. It features the voices of Rob Schneider, Heather Graham, Ken Jeong, Colm Meaney, Loretta Devine, Gabriel Iglesias, Michael McElhatton, and Bill Nighy, and is an international co-production of the United States, India, and Ireland. The UK version of the film features the voice of James Corden instead of Michael McElhatton. It was produced by Splash Entertainment and Telegael, and distributed by Lionsgate.

Norm of the North was theatrically released on January 15, 2016, and grossed $30.5 million on an $18 million budget. It was panned by both critics and is also considered to be the one of the worst animated movies ever made. It grossed $30.5 million against a budget of $18 million and spawned three direct-to-video sequels: Norm of the North: Keys to the Kingdom, released February 12, 2019; Norm of the North: King Sized Adventure, released June 11, 2019; and Norm of the North: Family Vacation, released February 25, 2020.

Plot
Norm, a polar bear, is the son of the King of the Arctic. In his youth, he realizes his ability to speak to humans, a trait shared only by his grandfather. Because of this, he is made an outcast from the other animals, only being accepted by Socrates, a wise seagull, and Elizabeth, a female polar bear whom Norm is in love with.

Years later, Norm's grandfather has become the world's most famous polar bear and human tourists are filling the Arctic. Socrates shows Norm and three Arctic lemmings a luxury condo that has been installed on the ice. Inside this condo is Vera, a representative for wealthy developer Mr. Greene. After Norm saves Vera from an avalanche, she tells him to find an actor to play a polar bear for their campaign. Norm denies this, but soon falls in love with Vera much to the jealousy of the lemmings. When his grandfather embarrasses him in front of the sea lions, Norm chases a boy named Pedro who then discovers Norm. But just before Pedro and Norm could get together, Norm is tranquilized and taken away from the Arctic leaving Pedro saddened about what happened and the Lemmings are also taken as well much to the horror of his grandfather.

The next morning, they wake up in New York City. Norm freaks out by this, but discovers Vera who has come to New York City as well. The Lemmings discover a filming Studio and they go in. However a man wearing some white glasses tries to attack Norm by struggling and strangling him in ropes. Norm manages to regain his strength and takes off the white glasses and is shocked by discovering that the disguise was Pedro. After hearing that Pedro works at the filming Studio, the two become friends and Norm apologizes for chasing him.

In the city, Norm pretends to be an actor and auditions for Pedro's commercial and is taken to dinner by Vera. The two celebrate and are succeeded by all of the hosts. During a public incident in the restaurant, Norm subdues Pedro gaining the attention of the media and heightening for approval ratings. Pedro decides to hire Norm as his mascot.

Before going on a television show, Norm meets Vera's daughter Olympia, who tells Norm to raise Greene's approval ratings and then speak out against him to save the Arctic. Norm's popularity heightens the approval ratings, but Pedro struggles to make a commercial Norm dreams of by playing recorded dialogue stating that Norm supports Greene's developments.

While filming about Norm's entire life, the lemmings go wild during the show breaking the camera and knocking out the camera woman. Pedro is fired from his job and is locked out before he could eventually apologize. Norm then has an argument with his grandfather about disobeying him and runs away. He then goes hungry and tries to get chili dogs, but is chased by the chilidog man. Meanwhile his grandfather is heartbroken and decides to go apologize to Norm, but he is captured by the animal control thinking he is a beast. Norm notices this and tries to rescue him, but fails.

Defeated, Norm is comforted by Vera and Olympia, who reveals that Greene is developing more homes to install in the Arctic. Norm and the lemmings discover that Greene is bribing a high-ranking member of the Polar Council, and exposes this to Pablo, one of Greene's investors. Vera resigns her position and is hired by Pablo, while Norm and the lemmings chase the truck holding the houses.
 
The animal control sends the truck carrying Norm's grandfather, and Norm is captured as well. After being freed by the lemmings, Norm and his grandfather get to the boat carrying the houses to the Arctic, and they are able to detach the houses. The Lemmings and Pedro distract the animal control by pretending that another animal is on the loose. Just as they are about to succeed however, Norm is separated from Pedro and his grandfather.

Norm awakens in the Arctic and is reunited with the lemmings and the other animals. Because of his heroism, Norm is crowned the King of the Arctic, but not before his grandfather and Pedro arrives. Meanwhile, the filming Studio is rebuilt and Pedro is rehired and Vera and Olympia are happy with Pablo as their new boss, while Norm and Elizabeth are allowed in the city and have three children together.

Cast
 Rob Schneider as Norm. Ken Katsumoto stated that the film's writing and production team wanted Norm to be like Rudolph the Red-Nosed Reindeer; much like how Rudolph perceived his red nose as a disadvantage for him but later helped Santa a lot, Norm sees his ability to communicate with humans as a negative, but it later ultimately saves the Arctic from Mr. Greene. According to Lionsgate's press release, Schneider was cast by the producers for the role of Norm due to his "vocal warmth and spot-on comedic instincts." As Katsumoto explained, “We immediately fell in love with Rob's voice,” Katsumoto says. “His vocal dexterity was amazing. He also did a great job of embellishing lines to make them funnier. Many of those ad-libs made it into the film.” As Schneider himself described Norm, "I always play the guy you can laugh at and say, 'My life's not that great, but look at that guy!' I think in this movie, other bears look at Norm that way. No one takes him seriously, but he follows his heart and it ends up saving their home. It's fun to play somebody who tries to achieve something big and ends up getting rewarded because he's not doing it for himself. That's a nice lesson for kids.”
 Heather Graham as Vera Brightly. The producers listened through numerous actress auditions for the part of Vera, looking for, in Katsumoto's words, a performance that was "fierce but sensitive at the same time."
 Ken Jeong as Mr. Greene. Jeong voiced Mr. Greene because he wanted to show his twin daughters a film that he starred in: "Most of the movies I do I can't show my kids yet. With Norm of the North, they'll finally be able to watch one of Daddy's movies. That was kind of a big incentive for me to be part of this project." As Katsumoto explained why Jeong was chosen for the role, "We fell in love with the fact that Ken can be villainous and likable at the same time. He's got incredible comic timing and spontaneity. Ken also has a lot of great subtext in his voice. Some people at advance screenings of the movie have cited Mr. Greene as their favorite character. That's rare for a villain.” As Jeong described Mr. Greene "Mr. Greene is a 50-year-old billionaire with a ponytail, and that's pretty much all you need to know. He's this misguided person who starts out with good intentions. He loves to meditate. He tries to incorporate these New Age concepts into his thinking until things go horribly awry."
 Maya Kay as Olympia Brightly, Vera's teenage daughter. Kay previously did voice acting for another animated film by Lionsgate, Alpha and Omega (2010). Kay said that she enjoyed voicing the character and working with Graham: "I was super excited to have Heather Graham play my mom – just like Vera, she's one of the sweetest people you'll ever meet." She also explained, "It was really awesome to play somebody so smart, with good intentions to help Norm save his home."
 Colm Meaney as Norm's grandfather
 Loretta Devine as Tamecia
 Gabriel Iglesias as Pablo and Stan
 Michael McElhatton (US) and James Corden (UK) as Laurence
 Bill Nighy as Socrates, an intelligent seagull
 Salome Jens as Councilwoman Klubeck
 Charlie Adler as Forebear
 G.K. Bowes as Female Tourist
 Debi Derryberry as Daughter
 Ben Diskin as Chef Kozawa
 Keith Ferguson as Human Tourist
 Dan Gordon as Nigel, Henchman #1, PA
 Jess Harnell as Male Tourist
 Kate Higgins as Elizabeth
 Mikey Kelley as Henchman #2
 Rove McManus as Junior Investor
 Emily Polydoros as Bratty Girl
 Eric Price as Caribou #1, Caribou #2
 Nick Shakoour as Costumed Bear
 Max Spitz as Teen Bear #1
 Janet Varney as Janet
 Rick D. Wasserman as Henchman #3

Director Trevor Wall provides the voice for the three main lemmings in the film, although he is not credited. As Nicolas Atlan described the lemmings, “We thought it would be hysterical to combine Norm, the largest creature in the Arctic, with lemmings that are small and indestructible. They can get squashed, they can get stomped on, they can have an elevator close on them, but like Silly Putty, they bounce right back into their original shape."

Marketing
Two mobile apps were released to promote the film as well as four clips on Lionsgate's YouTube channel and two theatrical trailers. Television commercials were played on several channels.

Reception

Box office and Release
, Norm of the North has grossed $17 million in North America and $10.4 million in other territories, for a worldwide total of $30.5 million, against a budget of $18 million.

The film was released on January 15, 2016, alongside 13 Hours: The Secret Soldiers of Benghazi and Ride Along 2. It grossed $9.4 million from 2,411 theaters over its opening four-day Martin Luther King Jr. weekend, finishing 6th at the box office.

International pre-sale rights to the film were acquired by Sierra/Affinity, who pre-sold the movie to distributors across the world, including Signature Entertainment in the United Kingdom and Ireland.

Critical response
, on Rotten Tomatoes, the film has an approval rating of 6% based on 69 reviews and an average rating of 3.10/10. The site's critical consensus read, "A pioneering feat in the field of twerking polar bear animation but blearily retrograde in every other respect, Norm of the North should only be screened in case of parental emergency." Shortly after release in January 2016, it temporarily had a rating of 0% on Rotten Tomatoes based on 35 reviews at the time. It was the first animated film to ever receive a 6% on Rotten Tomatoes until The Emoji Movie. On Metacritic, as of August 2020, the film had a score of 21 out of 100, based on 18 critics, indicating "generally unfavorable reviews". Audiences polled by CinemaScore gave the film an average grade of "B−" on an A+ to F scale.

Critic Mark Dujsik gave the film 1 out of 4 possible stars, writing that "Norm of the North doesn't care about the environment, the animals of the Arctic, or even kids for that matter. It wants to be 'cute and marketable' as cheaply as possible". James White of Empire gave the film 1 out of 5 possible stars, writing that "we wouldn't recommend you watch it even after you've burned through every other possibility – and that includes a blank screen". Mark Kermode of The Observer called the film a "dull ... below-par Ice Age-style tale in which the highlight is a group of vulgar lemmings". Michael Rechtshaffen of The Los Angeles Times called the film "blandly uninspired", and Soren Andersen of The Seattle Times called the film an "idiotic animated comedy", writing that "No child should be exposed to this".

Geoff Berkshire of Variety called the film a "blandly executed pic" that "will quickly head south to an ancillary afterlife". Katie Rife of The A.V. Club gave the film a "D" grade, writing that "this is a movie for children. But using that as a justification for lazy work, as if kids are inherently too dumb to know the difference, isn't just condescending. In a post-Pixar world, where audiences have become accustomed to quality animated family films, it's a waste of money". Stephen Schaefer of The Boston Herald gave the film a grade of "B−", writing that, despite being "hardly original ... 'Norm' has oodles of charm, a razor-sharp wit, and pacing that should keep even preschoolers attentive".

Edwin L. Carpenter of The Dove Foundation gave the film its Family-Approved seal, writing that "your kids will enjoy Norm's company–he's funny and a role model for doing the right thing."

Home media
Norm of the North was released on DVD, Blu-ray, and digital HD on April 19, 2016.

Sequels
Prior to the official theatrical release of the film, two 45-minute direct-to-DVD sequels were announced, titled Norm of the North: Back to the City and Norm of the North: The Arctic All-Stars.

On January 22, 2018, it was announced that production on a sequel produced by Assemblage Entertainment, along with Splash Entertainment, Lionsgate and DFG Family, had begun. The resulting film, Norm of the North: Keys to the Kingdom was given a limited theatrical release on January 11, 2019, with a home release on February 12, 2019.

In 2019, two more sequels were announced, Norm of the North: King Sized Adventure and Norm of the North: Family Vacation. Norm of the North: King Sized Adventure was released on Blu-ray, DVD and digital on June 11, 2019 and Norm of the North: Family Vacation was released on DVD, digital and on-demand on February 25, 2020. A fifth film was said to be in production, but no other information has been revealed.

Maya Kay is the only cast member to return for the sequels, while Norm is voiced by Andrew Toth.

References

External links

 
 
 
 
 

2016 films
2016 3D films
2016 comedy films
2016 computer-animated films
2016 directorial debut films
2010s American animated films
2010s children's adventure films
2010s children's comedy films
2010s adventure comedy films
2010s English-language films
American 3D films
American computer-animated films
American children's animated adventure films
American children's animated comedy films
American adventure comedy films
3D animated films
Environmental films
Films about polar bears
Films set in the Arctic
Animated films set in New York City
Lionsgate films
Lionsgate animated films
Assemblage Entertainment